The National Union of Norwegian Locomotivemen (NLF) is a trade union representing train drivers in Norway.

History
The union was founded on 22 October 1893 as the Norwegian National Locomotive Personnel Union, and joined the Norwegian Confederation of Trade Unions in 1919.   By 1963, the union had 2,049 members, and this has since declined to around 1,700.

Presidents
1893: Karl Andersen
1901: Ludvig O. Bauer
1908: Emil Sandberg
1911: Thorvald Nordahl
1916: Jens Kraft Lund
1919: Sigurd Iversen
1924: Emil Sandberg
1925: Robert Lund
1931: Thorleif Narvestad
1950: Mathias Heggestad
1961: Oluf Andreas Anfinsen
1975: Gunnar Tønder
1989: Oddvar Skaar
1991: Øystein Aslaksen
2011: Rolf Ringdal

References

Further reading

External links

Railway labor unions
Trade unions established in 1893
Trade unions in Norway